A medical savings account (MSA) is an account into which tax-deferred amounts from income can be deposited. The amounts are often called contributions and may be made by a worker, an employer, or both, depending on a country's laws.

The money in such accounts is to be used to pay for medical expenses. Withdrawals from the account often called distributions, if made for that reason, may or may not be subject to income tax. Withdrawals without adequate documentation of use for medical expenses are subject to penalties.

In China
In December 1994, the China began a pilot study of medical savings accounts in the cities of Zhenjiang and Jiujiang. China has planned to expand the program.

In Singapore

Medisave was introduced in April 1984 as a national medical savings system in Singapore. It allows Singaporeans to put aside part of their income into a Medisave account to meet future personal or immediate family's hospitalization, day surgery and for certain outpatient expenses.

Under this system, Singaporean employees contribute 6–8% (depending on age group) of their monthly salaries to a personal Medisave account. The savings can be withdrawn to pay the hospital bills of the account holder and immediate family members.

United States

The United States has two medical savings account programs:
 Medical savings account (started 1993, still prevalent in California)
 Health savings account (created 2003, supersedes MSAs, more widely available)

See also
Health care system

References

External links 

Health economics
Tax-advantaged savings plans